Food Court Wars is an American competitive reality television cooking show on the Food Network that puts two teams of entrepreneurs in a shopping mall together with the teams having to battle each other in order to win a food court restaurant of their own, rent-free, for a year. Each week's show is at a different city mall in the United States. The malls want to open a new "local" eatery in the mall's food court that offer a fresh, region-specific menu. The teams test, market, then run their concept for a full day feeding shoppers. The team restaurant that makes the most profit at the end of the day wins their eatery space, which is a prize worth an estimated $100,000, and the losing team must vacate the premises. The show premiered on July 7, 2013. The first season finale, which was a rebroadcast of the pilot episode, aired on August 18, 2013. Season 2 premiered on February 23, 2014, and consisted of thirteen episodes.

Summary
Food Court Wars pits two teams of food entrepreneurs against one another as they battle to win their own food court restaurant. The team whose restaurant makes the most profit wins their eatery space—a prize worth $100,000.

Episodes

Season 1 (2013)

Season 2 (2014)

References

External links
 
 

2010s American reality television series
2013 American television series debuts
2014 American television series endings
English-language television shows
Food Network original programming